Maitri Netmanee also known as Orachunnoi Hor Mahachai;  is a retired Thai Muay Thai fighter and amateur boxer.

Biography and career

Orachunnoi was born in 1950 in the city of Tkhakek, Laos from thai parents working at the border. He grew up in the Ubon Ratchathani province where he started Muay Thai training at the age of 10 with his uncle. He later joined the Hor Machachai camp in Bangkok.

On the main circuit in Bangkok he rapidly established himself as the best fighter around the flyweight limit, winning a Lumpinee stadium title. Due to his domination in the lighter divisions he was put in numerous weight handicap matches with differences going as high as 12 lbs. He was famous for his ability to turn tides at the last second generating a massive income for spectactors who gambled on him, he was granted the nickname "The poor man's favorite". He was a spectacular fighter known for his reverse elbow attacks and surprising spinning kick techniques, at the peak of his career during the mid-1970s he was receiving purses going as high as 45,000 baht.

Orachunnoi had to undergo surgery for appendicitis in 1970 and disappeared from the rings for almost a year. He returned to competition and became a Lumpinee Champion for the second time when he was selected for the Thai national amateur boxing team. He won several medals at major gatherings such as the Asian Championship, the World Military Boxing Championship and the SEA Games all in the flyweight division.

Orachunnoi retired from competition in 1989 after losing to rising star Detduang Por Pongsawang. He married a nursing assistant in Ubon Ratchathani, had 3 children and became a trainer for the camp "Por.Thawatchai" before moving to Japan. Back to Thailand and after 25 years working as a trainer he opened a coffee shop at the Sri Maha Pho Hospital in Ubon Ratchathani province.

On March 6, 2020, Orachunnoi was inducted to the Siam Kela Muay Thai Hall of Fame at the 14th Siam Sports Awards.

Titles and accomplishments
Lumpinee Stadium
2x Lumpinee Stadium 112 lbs Champion

Muay Thai record

|-  style="background:#fbb;"
| 1983-10-22 || Loss ||align=left| Detduang Por Pongsawang || Rajadamnern Stadium || Bangkok, Thailand || Decision || 5 || 3:00

|-  style="background:#cfc;"
| 1983-07-30 || Win ||align=left| Setlek Sitsingket || || Roi Et, Thailand || Decision || 5 || 3:00

|-  style="background:#;"
| 1983-03-11 ||  ||align=left| Kangsadan Sor.Prateep || || Ubon Ratchathani province, Thailand || ||  ||

|-  style="background:#fbb;"
| 1983-02-19 || Loss ||align=left| Yutthakarn Petchyindee ||Lumpinee Stadium || Bangkok, Thailand || ||  ||

|-  style="background:#fbb;"
| 1981- || Loss ||align=left| Palangsua Trabaihor ||Lumpinee Stadium || Bangkok, Thailand || Decision || 5 || 3:00

|-  style="background:#;"https://www.facebook.com/groups/251930348311399/posts/1503875803116841/
| 1981-07-24 ||  ||align=left| Kangsadan Sor.Prateep ||Lumpinee Stadium || Bangkok, Thailand || Decision || 5 || 3:00

|-  style="background:#;"
| 1981-04-24 || ||align=left| Daradej Kiatmuangtrang|| Lumpinee Stadium|| Bangkok, Thailand || ||  ||

|-  style="background:#fbb;"
| 1981- || Loss ||align=left| Petchnoi Manukiat || || Phrae, Thailand || Decision || 5 || 3:00

|-  style="background:#fbb;"
| 1980-11-07 || Loss ||align=left| Den Chuwattana || Lumpinee Stadium || Bangkok, Thailand || Decision || 5 || 3:00

|-  style="background:#cfc;"
| 1980-09-26|| Win ||align=left| Yodded Singsornthong ||  Lumpinee Stadium || Bangkok, Thailand || Decision ||5 || 3:00

|-  style="background:#fbb;"
| 1980-01-08 || Loss ||align=left| Maewpa Sitchang || Lumpinee Stadium || Bangkok, Thailand || Decision || 5 || 3:00

|-  style="background:#;"
| 1979-12-18||  ||align=left| Fonluang Luksadejmaephuangthong || Lumpinee Stadium || Bangkok, Thailand|| ||  ||

|-  style="background:#;"
| 1979-11-23||  ||align=left| Maewpa Sitchang || Lumpinee Stadium || Bangkok, Thailand|| ||  ||

|-  style="background:#;"
| 1979-10-05||  ||align=left| Chatri Lukphaileuang || || Bangkok, Thailand || ||  ||

|-  style="background:#;"https://www.facebook.com/plakangtakuapa/posts/3328013000756513
| 1979-08-13||  ||align=left| Ananlek Lukminburi || Rajadamnern Stadium || Bangkok, Thailand || ||  ||

|-  style="background:#;"
| 1979-05-29||  ||align=left| Jom Kalteksawang || || Bangkok, Thailand || ||  ||

|-  style="background:#cfc;"
| 1979-04-13|| Win ||align=left| Kiatmongkol Kiatsuriya || Rajadamnern Stadium || Bangkok, Thailand || Decision || 5 ||3:00

|-  style="background:#;"
| 1979- || ||align=left| Samingnoom Sithiboontham ||  ||  Thailand || ||  ||

|-  style="background:#;"
| 1979-01-23 || ||align=left| Samingnoom Sithiboontham ||  || Ubon Ratchathani, Thailand || ||  ||

|-  style="background:#fbb;"
| 1979-01-02|| Loss ||align=left| Rungroj Lukcholae || Lumpinee Stadium || Bangkok, Thailand || Decision || 5||3:00

|-  style="background:#fbb;"
| 1978-12-06|| Loss ||align=left| Banpong Sitamornchai || Lumpinee Stadium || Bangkok, Thailand || Decision || 5||3:00

|-  style="background:#cfc;"
| 1978-10-12|| Win ||align=left| Singpathom Pongsurakarn || Rajadamnern Stadium || Bangkok, Thailand || Decision || 5 ||3:00

|-  style="background:#fbb;"
| 1978-09-15|| Loss ||align=left| Pon Sitpordaeng || Lumpinee Stadium || Bangkok, Thailand || Decision || 5 ||3:00

|-  style="background:#cfc;"
| 1978-09-02|| Win ||align=left| Fahkhamram Singkhlongsuan ||   || Ubon Ratchathani province, Thailand || Decision || 5||3:00

|-  style="background:#;"
| 1978-07-14||  ||align=left| Rungroj Lukcholae ||   || Chiang Mai, Thailand || || ||

|-  style="background:#cfc;"
| 1978-04-11|| Win ||align=left| Jaipetch Chaweewong ||  Lumpinee Stadium || Bangkok, Thailand || Decision || 5||3:00

|-  style="background:#cfc;"
| 1978-03-10|| Win ||align=left| Densiam Sor.Prateep ||  Lumpinee Stadium || Bangkok, Thailand || Decision || 5||3:00

|-  style="background:#fbb;"
| 1978-|| Loss ||align=left| Sornarai Sakwittaya || Lumpinee Stadium || Bangkok, Thailand  || Decision||5 || 3:00  
|-
! style=background:white colspan=9 |

|-  style="background:#fbb;"
| 1978-01-13|| Loss ||align=left| Pannoi Sakornphitak ||  Lumpinee Stadium || Bangkok, Thailand || Decision || 5||3:00

|-  style="background:#fbb;"
| 1977-12-06|| Loss ||align=left| Banpong Sitamornchai || Lumpinee Stadium || Bangkok, Thailand || Decision || 5||3:00

|-  style="background:#cfc;"
| 1977-11-17|| Win ||align=left| Phetpayao Sitkrutat || Rajadamnern Stadium || Bangkok, Thailand || Decision || 5 ||3:00

|-  style="background:#;"
| 1977-09-20 ||  ||align=left| Khaokrachang Rerkchai || Lumpinee Stadium || Bangkok, Thailand || Decision || 5 || 3:00

|-  style="background:#cfc;"
| 1977-|| Win ||align=left| Sornarai Sakwittaya ||   || Tokyo, Japan || Decision||5 || 3:00  
|-
! style=background:white colspan=9 |

|-  style="background:#cfc;"
| 1977-08-02|| Win ||align=left| Jaidee Lukbangplasoi || Lumpinee Stadium || Bangkok, Thailand || KO (Punches)|| 3 ||

|-  style="background:#fbb;"
| 1977-07-08|| Loss ||align=left| Rojanadet Rojanasongkram || Lumpinee Stadium || Bangkok, Thailand || Decision || 5||3:00

|-  style="background:#cfc;"
| 1977-05-27|| Win ||align=left| Thanusuk Ratchasakmontri || Lumpinee Stadium || Bangkok, Thailand || KO (Punches)|| 3 ||

|-  style="background:#fbb;"
| 1977-04-29|| Loss ||align=left| Ruankaew Sor Prasit || Lumpinee Stadium || Bangkok, Thailand || Decision || 5||3:00

|-  style="background:#cfc;"
| 1977-03-10 || Win ||align=left| Densiam Sor.Prateep || Lumpinee Stadium || Bangkok, Thailand || Decision || 5 || 3:00

|-  style="background:#cfc;"
| 1977-01- || Win ||align=left| Khaokrachang Rerkchai || Lumpinee Stadium || Bangkok, Thailand || Decision || 5 || 3:00

|-  style="background:#fbb;"
| 1977-02-18|| Loss ||align=left| Jomwo Lookgaokawang || Lumpinee Stadium || Bangkok, Thailand || Decision || 5||3:00

|-  style="background:#fbb;"
| 1976-12-27 || Loss ||align=left| Padejsuk Pitsanurachan || Rajadamnern Stadium || Bangkok, Thailand || Decision || 5 || 3:00

|-  style="background:#fbb;"
| 1976-12-07 || Loss ||align=left| Prawit Sritham || Lumpinee Stadium || Bangkok, Thailand || Decision || 5 || 3:00

|-  style="background:#cfc;"
| 1976-11-|| Win ||align=left| Yodded Singsornthong ||  Lumpinee Stadium || Bangkok, Thailand || KO||5 ||  
|-
! style=background:white colspan=9 |

|-  style="background:#fbb;"
| 1976-10-30|| Loss ||align=left| Petchnamnueng Mongkolphithak ||   || Lampang province, Thailand || Decision ||5 || 3:00

|-  style="background:#cfc;"
| 1976-10-22|| Win ||align=left| Thanusuk Prasopchai ||  Lumpinee Stadium || Bangkok, Thailand || KO||5 ||

|-  style="background:#cfc;"
| 1976-09-27|| Win ||align=left| Bangsai Kongkalai ||  Rajadamnern Stadium || Bangkok, Thailand || Decision|| 5 || 3:00

|-  style="background:#cfc;"
| 1976-09-03|| Win ||align=left| Apidejnoi Sithiran ||  Lumpinee Stadium || Bangkok, Thailand || Referee stoppage|| 4 ||

|-  style="background:#cfc;"
| 1976-08-18|| Win||align=left| Thong Porntawee||  Lumpinee Stadium || Bangkok, Thailand || Decision || 5 || 3:00

|-  style="background:#fbb;"
| 1976-07-29|| Loss||align=left| Singnum Phetthanin||  Lumpinee Stadium || Bangkok, Thailand || Decision || 5 || 3:00

|-  style="background:#cfc;"
| 1976-06-22|| Win||align=left| Chainarong Sitpiboon||  Lumpinee Stadium || Bangkok, Thailand || Decision || 5 || 3:00

|-  style="background:#cfc;"
| 1976-05-|| Win||align=left| Chanchai Napaetrew||  Lumpinee Stadium || Bangkok, Thailand || KO || 4 ||

|-  style="background:#cfc;"
| 1976-03-29|| Win||align=left| Chanchai Napaetrew||  Lumpinee Stadium || Bangkok, Thailand || Decision || 5 || 3:00

|-  style="background:#fbb;"
| 1976-03-|| Loss||align=left| Apidejnoi Sithiran ||  Rajadamnern Stadium || Bangkok, Thailand || Decision || 5 || 3:00

|-  style="background:#fbb;"
| 1976-02-16|| Loss||align=left| Petchnamnueng Mongkolphithak||  Rajadamnern Stadium || Bangkok, Thailand || Decision || 5 || 3:00

|-  style="background:#cfc;"
| 1976-02-01|| Win||align=left| Samansak Poonsapcharoen|| || Hat Yai, Thailand || Decision || 5 || 3:00

|-  style="background:#fbb;"
| 1976-01-08|| Loss||align=left| Channoi Rungrit||  Rajadamnern Stadium || Bangkok, Thailand || Decision || 5 || 3:00

|-  style="background:#fbb;"
| 1975-12-11|| Loss||align=left| Yodded Singsornthong||  Lumpinee Stadium || Bangkok, Thailand || Decision || 5 || 3:00
|-
! style=background:white colspan=9 |

|-  style="background:#cfc;"
| 1975-11-20|| Win||align=left| Singnum Phetthanin||  Rajadamnern Stadium || Bangkok, Thailand || Decision || 5 || 3:00

|-  style="background:#cfc;"
| 1975-11-05|| Win||align=left| Panchadej Wor.Chartniran||  Rajadamnern Stadium  || Thailand || TKO (Punch) || 5 ||

|-  style="background:#cfc;"
| 1975-10-16|| Win||align=left| Numthanong Suanmisakawan|| Rajadamnern Stadium || Bangkok, Thailand  || KO || 4 ||

|-  style="background:#c5d2ea;"
| 1975-09-26|| Draw||align=left| Yodded Singsornthong||  Lumpinee Stadium || Bangkok, Thailand || Decision || 5 || 3:00

|-  style="background:#cfc;"
| 1975-09-01|| Win||align=left| Saengdao Sakprasert||   || Thailand || KO || 3 ||

|-  style="background:#c5d2ea;"
| 1975-07-28|| Draw||align=left| Channoi Rungrit|| Rajadamnern Stadium || Bangkok, Thailand || Decision || 5 || 3:00

|-  style="background:#cfc;"
| 1975-06-17|| Win||align=left| Thanupij Sit Sor||   || Thailand || KO || 4 ||

|-  style="background:#cfc;"
| 1975-05-30|| Win||align=left| Nongrak Singkrungthon|| Lumpinee Stadium || Bangkok, Thailand || KO || 4 ||

|-  style="background:#cfc;"
| 1975-05-05|| Win||align=left| Winainoi Nor Ban Khod||    || Bangkok, Thailand|| KO || 4 ||

|-  style="background:#fbb;"
| 1975-04-12|| Loss ||align=left| Daonil Singhasawin||   || Ubon Ratchathani province, Thailand || Decision || 5 || 3:00

|-  style="background:#cfc;"
| 1975-03-18|| Win||align=left| Sraththa Ro.S̄or.Phor||  Lumpinee Stadium  || Bangkok, Thailand || Decision || 5 || 3:00

|-  style="background:#fbb;"
| 1975-01-31|| Loss ||align=left| Singnum Phetthanin||  Lumpinee Stadium  || Bangkok, Thailand || Decision || 5 || 3:00

|-  style="background:#fbb;"
| 1975-01-07|| Loss ||align=left| Yodded Singsornthong||  Lumpinee Stadium  || Bangkok, Thailand || Decision || 5 || 3:00

|-  style="background:#cfc;"
| 1974-11-22|| Win ||align=left| Singsuk Sor Roopsuay || Lumpinee Stadium || Bangkok, Thailand || Decision || 5||3:00

|-  style="background:#fbb;"
| 1974-06-11|| Loss ||align=left| Yodchat Sor.Jitpattana || Lumpinee Stadium || Bangkok, Thailand || KO (Elbow) || 1||0:35
|-
! style=background:white colspan=9 |

|-  style="background:#fbb;"
| 1974-05-23|| Loss ||align=left| Ruengsak Porntawee || Rajadamnern Stadium || Bangkok, Thailand || Decision || 5||3:00

|-  style="background:#fbb;"
| ? || Loss||align=left| Yodded Singsornthong||  Lumpinee Stadium || Bangkok, Thailand || Decision || 5 || 3:00
|-
! style=background:white colspan=9 |

|-  style="background:#cfc;"
| 1973-12-07|| Win ||align=left| Ruanpae Sitwatnang || Lumpinee Stadium || Bangkok, Thailand || Decision || 5||3:00

|-  style="background:#cfc;"
| 1973-11-14|| Win ||align=left| Muanglai Sakkasem || Rajadamnern Stadium || Bangkok, Thailand || TKO || 4||

|-  style="background:#;"
| 1973-10-24|| ||align=left| Ruanpae Sitwatnang || Rajadamnern Stadium || Bangkok, Thailand || || ||

|-  style="background:#fbb;"
| 1973-08-21|| Loss ||align=left| Chandet Weerapol || Lumpinee Stadium || Bangkok, Thailand || Decision || 5||3:00

|-  style="background:#fbb;"
| 1973-01-12|| Loss ||align=left| Kilrung Lukchaomaesaithong||  Lumpinee Stadium  || Bangkok, Thailand || KO|| 2 ||

|-  style="background:#cfc;"
| 1972-10-25|| Win ||align=left| Manopnoi Singkrungthon||  Lumpinee Stadium  || Bangkok, Thailand || Decision || 5 || 3:00

|-  style="background:#cfc;"
| 1972-10-12|| Win ||align=left| Manopnoi Singkrungthon||  Lumpinee Stadium  || Bangkok, Thailand || Decision || 5 || 3:00

|-  style="background:#cfc;"
| 1972-08-16|| Win ||align=left| Barungthang Ror.For.Thor.||  Rajadamnern Stadium  || Bangkok, Thailand || Decision || 5 || 3:00

|-  style="background:#cfc;"
| 1972-07-21 || Win ||align=left| Daothong Sityodtong|| Lumpinee Stadium || Bangkok, Thailand || Decision || 5 || 3:00

|-  style="background:#cfc;"
| 1971-12-05|| Win ||align=left| Daothong Sityodtong||  Lumpinee Stadium  || Bangkok, Thailand || KO || 5 ||

|-  style="background:#cfc;"
| 1969-|| Win ||align=left| Luklop Sitsomkid||  || Saraburi province, Thailand || KO || 4 ||

|-  style="background:#cfc;"
| 1969-|| Win ||align=left| Daothong Sityodtong||  Lumpinee Stadium  || Bangkok, Thailand || Decision || 5 || 3:00

|-  style="background:#cfc;"
| 1969-11-07|| Win ||align=left| Saknarong Sakthanin ||  Lumpinee Stadium  || Bangkok, Thailand ||KO|| 2 ||

|-  style="background:#fbb;"
| 1969-|| Loss ||align=left| Prapichit Sityodtong||  Lumpinee Stadium  || Bangkok, Thailand || Decision || 5 || 3:00

|-  style="background:#cfc;"
| 1969-|| Win ||align=left| Kaenlek Siharatdecho||  Lumpinee Stadium  || Bangkok, Thailand || TKO||  ||

|-  style="background:#cfc;"
| 1969-|| Win ||align=left| Daothong Sityodtong||  Lumpinee Stadium  || Bangkok, Thailand || Decision || 5 || 3:00

|-  style="background:#cfc;"
| 1969-|| Win ||align=left| Luklop Sitsomkid||  || Saraburi province, Thailand || TKO || 3 ||

|-  style="background:#fbb;"
| 1969-|| Loss ||align=left| Daothong Sityodtong||  || Bangkok, Thailand || Decision || 5 || 3:00

|-  style="background:#cfc;"
| 1969-|| Win ||align=left| Huamed Singchakrawat|| Lumpinee Stadium || Bangkok, Thailand || Decision || 5 || 3:00

|-  style="background:#cfc;"
| 1969-|| Win ||align=left| Aswinnoi Singnongpho|| Lumpinee Stadium || Bangkok, Thailand || Decision || 5 || 3:00

|-  style="background:#cfc;"
| 1969-|| Win ||align=left| Kritphet Esakit||  || Bangkok, Thailand || KO || 3 ||

|-  style="background:#cfc;"
| 1969-|| Win ||align=left| Pornchai Sakwarin ||  || Ubon Ratchathani province, Thailand || KO ||  ||

|-  style="background:#cfc;"
| 1969-|| Win ||align=left| Rattanachai Sitpornchai|| Lumpinee Stadium || Bangkok, Thailand || Decision || 5 || 3:00

|-  style="background:#cfc;"
| 1969-|| Win ||align=left| Lukkaew Songrit||  || Chonburi province, Thailand || Decision || 5 || 3:00

|-  style="background:#cfc;"
| 1969-|| Win ||align=left| Sornoi Sirakan ||  || Chonburi province, Thailand || KO ||  ||

|-  style="background:#cfc;"
| 1969-|| Win ||align=left| Rittidet Srithai|| Lumpinee Stadium || Bangkok, Thailand || Decision || 5 || 3:00

|-  style="background:#cfc;"
| 1969-|| Win ||align=left| Akak Singbangpho ||  || Nonthaburi province, Thailand || KO || 2 ||

|-  style="background:#cfc;"
| 1969-|| Win ||align=left| Praemchai Sitpornchai|| Lumpinee Stadium || Bangkok, Thailand || KO || 4 ||

|-  style="background:#cfc;"
| 1969-|| Win ||align=left| Petchnoi Sor.Lukbukhalo ||  || Ratchaburi province, Thailand || KO || 4 ||

|-  style="background:#cfc;"
| 1969-|| Win ||align=left| Suchin Samanchan ||  || Ban Pong, Ratchaburi, Thailand || KO || 3 ||

|-  style="background:#cfc;"
| 1969-|| Win ||align=left| Weerachai Ruekchai|| Lumpinee Stadium || Bangkok, Thailand || KO || 3 ||

|-  style="background:#cfc;"
| 1969-|| Win ||align=left| Rattanachai Sor Luksiam ||  || Don Mueang district, Thailand || KO || 3 ||

|- style="text-align:center; background:#cfc;"
|1968-11-10
|Win
| align="left" | Sukkasem Saifaleb
|Charusathian Stadium
|Bangkok, Thailand
|Decision
|5
|3:00
|-
| colspan=9 | Legend:

References 

1950 births
Living people
Maitri Netmanee
Maitri Netmanee
Asian Games medalists in boxing
Maitri Netmanee
Southeast Asian Games medalists in boxing